Perissops ocellatus is a weevil in the Curculionidae family, found on the east coast of Australia in New South Wales and Queensland.

It was first described by Ludwig Redtenbacher in 1868 as Enteles ocellatus. It was assigned to the genus, Perissops in 1871 by Francis Polkinghorne Pascoe, giving the species name Perissops ocellatus.

References

External links 
Atlas of Living Australia: Perissops ocellatus images and occurrence data
Inaturalist: Perissops ocellatus NC images

Curculionidae

Insects described in 1868